A Start in Life may refer to: 

A Start in Life (charity), an Australian educational organisation
A Start in Life (Brookner novel), a 1981 debut novel by Anita Brookner
A Start in Life (Sillitoe novel), a 1970 novel by Alan Sillitoe